Lauren Chan is a Canadian model, editor and entrepreneur.

Career 
Originally from Brantford, Ontario, Chan graduated from University of Western Ontario in 2012 with a Bachelor of Arts in Sociology and French. She moved to the United States to pursue a career as a plus-sized model with Ford Models in New York City. While interning and freelance writing, she became a fashion writer and editor for Condé Nast-owned Glamour in 2015. She also helped to design the Glamour x Lane Bryant clothing line. Representing Glamour, Chan discussed size inclusivity on Good Morning America and The TODAY Show, but struggled to find clothes in plus sizes to wear to work. Three years later, Chan left her job to create Henning, a plus-sized workwear clothing brand. Ranging from size 12-24, the company's business model is based on slow fashion.

In 2018 American Society of Magazine Editors included Chan the ASME Next Award for Journalists Under 30. In 2019, Chan was named one of Chatelaine magazine's Women of the Year. That same year, she was recognized by Toronto Life magazine as one of the city's best-dressed Torontonians. In 2021, she was nominated for The Digital Fashion Creator of the Year Award from the Canadian Arts and Fashion Awards.

Activism 
Chan has been an ambassador for the National Eating Disorders Association since 2019. She is also a member of the advisory board for Model Alliance, an advocacy group for models.

References 

Canadian models
University of Western Ontario alumni
Canadian fashion journalists
Canadian business executives
Year of birth missing (living people)
Living people